The Russian occupation of Mykolaiv Oblast is an ongoing military occupation of Ukraine's Mykolaiv Oblast by Russian forces that began on 26 February 2022 during the Russian invasion of Ukraine as part of the southern Ukraine campaign. The Russian-installed occupation regime was called the "Nikolaev military-civilian administration".

Russia initially intended to occupy and annex the entire Mykolaiv Oblast, although this objective failed in the early months of the invasion. Russian forces never managed to capture the capital city of the oblast, Mykolaiv, although they attacked the city in February–April 2022. They managed to occupy territory in the southeast of the oblast, reaching as far as Voznesensk in March 2022 before withdrawing to the extreme southeast, bordering Kherson Oblast.

On 30 September 2022, Russia declared that it had annexed Kherson Oblast, claiming that the people of "Snihurivka Raion" (a Ukrainian district that was abolished and merged with Bashtanka Raion in 2020), including the city of Snihurivka, had voted to join Kherson Oblast. Meanwhile, Russia also annexed the outer portion of the Kinburn Peninsula—a semi-exclave of Mykolaiv Oblast—into Kherson Oblast (the inner portion of the peninsula is indeed a part of Kherson Oblast according to Ukrainian law).

On 10–11 November 2022, Ukrainian forces liberated Snihurivka and the surrounding area as part of the Ukrainian southern counteroffensive, in which a large swathe of territory in the west of Kherson Oblast—including the city of Kherson—was also liberated. As of 12 November 2022, Russian forces have been almost entirely expelled from the oblast, except for the outer portion of the Kinburn Peninsula in the far south, where Ukrainian forces have reportedly already entered. 

As of 11 November 2022, Russia still claims sovereignty over Snihurivka and the surrounding area, despite having totally lost control of this territory.

Occupation

Military Civilian Administration 

Shortly after invading Ukraine, Russian forces occupied the town of Snihurivka, which is approximately 60 km (37.3 miles) from the regional capital of Mykolaiv. Russia then continued to occupy surrounding towns near the border with Kherson Oblast, as well as several towns in the Biloberezhia Sviatoslava National Park, the latter of which became part of the Russian-occupied Kherson Oblast Military-Civilian Administration.

In late April, Russian forces prepared a referendum to integrate occupied areas into the Republic of Crimea as well as appoint a governor for the areas. Russian passports and Rubles are said to be issued and given out by September 1, which have been already issued and given out in Kherson and Zaporizhzhia administrations.

On 27 June 2022, the Security Service of Ukraine claimed to have detained a former deputy of the Mykolaiv City Council who was collaborating with Russian forces in Mykolaiv Oblast. He had an idea for the separation of Mykolaiv Oblast from Ukraine and the creation of a Russian backed separatist enclave called the "Mykolaiv People's Republic", he reportedly leaked information about the Armed Forces of Ukraine, hoping to obtain an executive position in the occupying administration. The plan was for the separatist enclave to exist until Russia's war in Ukraine was over, then the plan was for the "MPR" to be annexed to Russia. The Russians had allegedly also promised the collaborator an executive position in the "MPR" administration as a reward for his work if they managed to occupy the region.

The administration was officially established on 13 August 2022.

On 2 September, Russian forces captured the settlement of Pervomaiske, which remained the second largest in the occupied authority until the beginning of Russian withdrawal.

On 21 September, it was announced that the area surrounding Snihurivka as well as the outer portion of the Kinburn Peninsula, which constituted the parts of Mykolaiv Oblast that were under Russian control at the time, would be incorporated into Russia's administration in Kherson Oblast, ending the Nikolaev military-civilian administration. These areas would eventually on 30 September be annexed by Russia.

Russian annexation 
On 8 August 2022, Ekaterina Gubareva, deputy head of the Kherson Civilian-Military Administration announced the annexation of occupied territories of Mykolaiv Oblast. She also claimed that in some occupied towns, Russian mobile communications have begun to work. According to her, such a decision was made in order to provide the population with social payments in the "liberated" territories, as well as to establish mobile communications and television broadcasting.

On 13 August 2022, an article published by Tass, claimed that Yuriy Barbashov, governor of occupied territories claimed that a referendum in Snihurivka would take place to join Russia. The referendum would be aligned as the one in the Kherson Oblast.

On 11 September, following a major Ukrainian counteroffensive, it was announced that the proposed annexation referendums would be "indefinitely" postponed.

On 30 September, Russia claimed to officially annex the Kherson, Zaporizhzhia, Luhansk and Donetsk Oblasts. The occupied areas of the Mykolaiv Oblast including Snihurivka and Oleksandrivka were streamlined into the Kherson Oblast claimed by Russia. The United Nations General Assembly subsequently passed a resolution calling on countries not to recognise what it described as an "attempted illegal annexation" and demanded that Russia "immediately, completely and unconditionally withdraw".

Southern Ukrainian Counteroffensive 

Following the Southern Ukrainian Counteroffensive, it was reported that Russian troops were leaving Snihurivka and evacuating the population into Crimea and the occupied Kherson Oblast. During this time, Ukrainian forces recaptured Ternovi Pody and Liubomyrivka, west of occupied Tsentralne.

On 9 November, the Russian Defense Minister Sergei Shoigu announced the withdrawal of Russian forces from the right bank of the Dnieper River. The next day, Ukrainian forces re-entered the town of Snihurivka and raised the Ukrainian flag. A few other small settlements remained under Russian control. By 11 November Ukrainian forces had regained control of almost all of the oblast with only the outer portion of the Kinburn Peninsula remaining under Russian occupation.

Control of settlements

See also 
 Russian-occupied territories of Ukraine
 Russian occupation of Crimea
 Russian occupation of Chernihiv Oblast
 Russian occupation of Donetsk Oblast
 Russian occupation of Kharkiv Oblast
 Russian occupation of Kherson Oblast
 Russian occupation of Kyiv Oblast
 Russian occupation of Luhansk Oblast
 Russian occupation of Sumy Oblast
 Russian occupation of Zaporizhzhia Oblast
 Russian occupation of Zhytomyr Oblast
 Snake Island during the 2022 Russian invasion of Ukraine
 Annexation of Crimea by the Russian Federation
 Russian annexation of Donetsk, Kherson, Luhansk and Zaporizhzhia oblasts

Notes

References 

Mykolaiv
Mykolaiv military-civilian administration
History of Mykolaiv Oblast
Mykolaiv
Mykolaiv
Mykolaiv
Mykolaiv
Mykolaiv
Mykolaiv